The Precision Bass Plus is an electric bass made by Fender Musical Instruments Corporation and designed by George Blanda in 1989. It was one of the first American-made Fender basses to feature a 22-fret neck, requiring the company to slightly oversize the body shape and lengthen the cutaways, which distinctly changed the overall look of the instrument. Other features included a solid alder or ash body, a 1-piece maple neck with rosewood or maple fingerboard, adjustable Lace Sensor Precision and Jazz pickups, Schaller deluxe die-cast tuning machines, 3-ply black, parchment or 4-ply brown tortoise shell pickguard, Schaller Elite fine-tuning bridge, 3-way toggle pickup switch, master volume, series/parallel push-push button for the neck pickup and master TBX tone. It was discontinued in 1993.

The Precision Bass Plus Deluxe does not have a pick-guard. The Plus Deluxes also have active EQ, so there will be a battery as well. The jack will be on the lower bout, not on the pick-guard. This is the forerunner of today's American Deluxe Precision which replaced it in the line-up in July 1995. The Plus and the Plus Deluxe shared premium Schaller manufactured hardware similar to the Elite versions that came out during the waning days of Fullerton except for the 5 string versions which got Gotoh bridges instead of Schaller. The Precision Plus and Plus Deluxe were the creation of George Blanda who also designed Plus versions of the Jazz Bass. Blanda was the senior designer at Fender during this period and did some rather drastic mods on the instruments to compete with other high end designs from other companies. The Blanda redesigns were more innovative than anything Fender had done since the 1957 P-Bass and the 1960 introduction of the "Deluxe" Bass which we now know as the Jazz Bass. The Elite basses of the early 80's were super high quality versions too, but the basic design of the instruments were unaltered on any Elite series. The Plus was a new design.

These Blanda Plus designs are sometimes called "Boner Basses" because of the longer horns required to get good balance due to the 22 fret necks. Besides the missing pick-guard, the Precision Plus Deluxe will have a slightly smaller body than the Plus version also. Fender used select woods on both Plus versions too. "I hardly ever see one of either version come up for sale. If you can find one in original condition you should seriously consider it as it is a playable collectible. They traditionally have exceeded the appreciation in actual value over any other Fender basses of the period."

Precision Bass Plus Deluxe

This bass features the same specifications as the Precision Bass Plus, but has a downsized body shape, rear-routed controls, side-mounted jack socket and a Kubicki-designed 2-band active EQ with separate stacked control pots for master volume, pickup pan, treble and bass. Introduced in 1992, it was discontinued in 1994 and replaced by the American Deluxe Precision Bass in 1995.

Here are the specifications for the deluxe precision plus

Model Name: Deluxe Precision Bass(r) Plus 
Model Number: 019-7600 and 019-7602 
Series: U.S. Plus/Deluxe Series 
Body: Downsized Alder Body 
Neck: Maple 
Fingerboard: Rosewood (019-7600) or Maple (019-7602) Fretboard 
No. of Frets: 22 
Scale Length: 34" (864 mm) 
Width @ Nut: 1.625" (41 mm) 
Hardware: Chrome 
Machine Heads: Fender Schaller Elite 
Bridge: Deluxe Plus with Fine Tuners 
Pickguard: N/A 
Pickups: 2 Silver Fender LaceTM Sensor pickups, (1 P Bass(r) and 1 J 
Bass(r)) 
Pickup Switching: Pan Pot 
Controls: Master Volume, 
Pan Pot, 
Master Treble Boost/Cut, 
Master Bass Boost/Cut 
Colors: (706) Black, 
(715) Lipstick Red, 
(732) Brown Sunburst, 
(747) Caribbean Mist, 
(773) Midnight Blue, 
(775) Midnight Wine, 
(780) Arctic White, 
(790) Blue Pearl Burst, 
(791) Black Pearl Burst 
Strings: 
Unique Features: Active Electronics 
Source: U.S. 
Accessories: Case 
U.S. MSRP: $1,119.99 
Specifications: Prices and Specifications Subject to Change Without Notice 
INTRODUCED: 1992 
DISCONTINUED: 1994

Available Colors

A 1995 brochure from Fender lists the available colors for this line: Black (06), Vintage White (07), Lipstick Red (15), Mystic Black (19), Crimson Burst (28), Brown Sunburst (32), Blue Burst (36), Antique Burst (37), Arctic White (80), Electric Blue (87), Blue Pearl Burst (90) and Black Pearl Burst (91).

The Precision Plus and Plus Deluxe came also in Natural with a solid ash body.

Literature
Peter Bertges: The Fender Reference; Bomots, Saarbrücken 2007,

References

Precision Bass Plus